XHYG-FM is a radio station on 90.5 FM in Matías Romero, Oaxaca. It is part of CMI, the media company owned by the Lopezlena family, and carries its Ke Buena grupera format from Radiópolis.

History
XEYG-AM 660 received its concession on June 6, 1970. It was owned by Marcelino Martínez Moreno.

XEYG received approval to migrate to FM in 2011.

References

Radio stations in Oaxaca
Radio stations in Mexico with continuity obligations